Ardasan is a rural locality (a settlement) in Selenginsky District, Republic of Buryatia, Russia. The population was 163 as of 2010. There are 4 streets.

Geography 
Ardasan is located 25 km north of Gusinoozyorsk (the district's administrative centre) by road. Yagodnoye is the nearest rural locality.

References 

Rural localities in Selenginsky District